Hasan Ali Darreh Forkh (also Romanized as Ḩasan ʿAlī Darreh Forkh) is a village in Lalar and Katak Rural District, Chelo District, Andika County, Khuzestan Province, Iran. At the 2006 census, its population was 51, in 9 families.

References 

Populated places in Andika County